Hal Law (February 21, 1904 - November 14, 1980) was an American short comedy film screenwriter and director. Hal was involved during the 1930s and 1940s, known for his short films such as Goin' Fishin', 1-2-3 Go, Fightin' Fools, and Baby Blues as part of the Our Gang, a series of American comedy short produced by Metro-Goldwyn-Mayer.

Biography 

Born in Chicago, Illinois Hall is best known as a Hal Roach Studios director of the Our Gang short subjects film and as the co-writer, along with Robert A. McGowan, of the series that was produced by Metro-Goldwyn-Mayer. Hal died on November 14, 1980 in Los Angeles, California.

Filmography 
 Hired Husband (1947)
 Dancing Romeo (1944)
 Tale of a Dog (1944)
 Radio Bugs (1944)
 Three Smart Guys (1943)
 Little Miss Pinkerton (1943)
 Election Daze (1943)
 Farm Hands (1943)
 Family Troubles (1943)
 Benjamin Franklin, Jr. (1943)
 Unexpected Riches (1942)
 Mighty Lak a Goat (1942)
 Rover's Big Chance (1942)
 Surprised Parties (1942)
 Don't Lie (1942)
 Going to Press (1942)
 Wedding Worries (1941)
 Come Back, Miss Pipps (1941)
 Helping Hands (1941)
 Robot Wrecks (1941)
 1-2-3 Go! (1941
 Fightin' Fools (1941)
 Baby Blues (1941)
 Kiddie Kure (1940)
 Goin' Fishin' (1940)
 Waldo's Last Stand (1940)
 Good Bad Boys (1940)
 Bubbling Troubles (1940)
 The New Pupil (1940)
 All About Hash (1940)
 The Big Premiere (1940)
 Alfalfa's Double (1940)
 Time Out for Lessons (1939)
 Dad for a Day (1939)
 Captain Spanky's Show Boat (1939)
 Auto Antics (1939)
 Joy Scouts (1939)
 Cousin Wilbur (1939)
 Clown Princes (1939)
 Duel Personalities (1939)
 Tiny Troubles (1939)
 Alfalfa's Aunt (1939)
 Practical Jokers (1938)
 Football Romeo (1938)
 Men in Fright (1938)
 Aladdin's Lantern (1938)
 The Little Ranger (1938)

References 

American film directors
Hal Roach Studios filmmakers
Writers from Chicago
American male screenwriters
1904 births
1980 deaths
Screenwriters from Illinois
Film producers from Illinois
20th-century American male writers
20th-century American screenwriters